Paid Dues  was an annual hip hop festival that took place in California, until the summer of 2006, when it was announced that the festival would travel to multiple locations. The last festival took place in 2013.

Paid Dues was an event presented by Murs 3:16 in association with Guerilla Union.

On March 11, 2006 the first Paid Dues festival sold out, with over 5,000 concert goers packing the Shrine Expo Center in Los Angeles. The line-up for the Paid Dues 2006 Festival included the debut live performance from Felt (Murs of Living Legends and Slug and Ant of Atmosphere).

Paid Dues Festival 2006

Paid Dues Festival 2007

Paid Dues Tour 2007
Following the success of the second annual PAID DUES festival in Southern California promoters MURS 3:16 in association with Guerilla Union (Rock The Bells, Cypress Hill's Smokeout) have announced they will tour.

"The national touring of PAID DUES is a dream come true. It’s what I had in mind when I first brought the idea to Guerilla Union--something like a Warped tour for underground hip-hop, where my friends and I could be outside in the daylight enjoying summer with our fans instead of cramped up in some dark smelly nightclub worried about staying up too late and being too tired for work the next morning,” states MURS. “It also provides a safe and comfortable environment in which the younger fans can be introduced to a proper live hip-hop show."

PAID DUES hit over 10 major markets across the country. It will pass through various sized venues ranging from 1,000 to 40,000 capacities. In New York City (July 28 and 29) and Los Angeles (August 11), PAID DUES will merge with the Rock The Bells festivals featuring headliners Rage Against the Machine and the Wu-Tang Clan.

Paid Dues Festival 2008

Paid Dues Tour 2008

Paid Dues Festival 2009

Paid Dues  Festival 2010

Paid Dues  Festival 2011

Paid Dues  Festival 2012
On the afternoon of December 13, 2011, Murs once again hosted a live chat session on uStream to announce the headliners for the next edition of the Paid Dues Festival: Wu-Tang Clan and Odd Future topped the bill, with more acts announced leading up to the festival. It continued the annual tradition by once again taking place at the NOS Events Center in San Bernardino, CA.

Grind Time Battles
Dirtbag Dan v. Isaac
Jonny Storm v. Real Talk

Paid Dues  Festival 2013

See also

List of hip hop music festivals
Hip hop culture

References

External links
Rock The Bells - Official Website
Guerilla Union - Official Website
Paid Dues - Official Website
Paid Dues 2011 Gallery and Review
Paid Dues Festival 2011 - Review/Photos

Music festivals in California
Hip hop music festivals in the United States
Concert tours
Music festivals established in 2006